Dhak Malikpur  is a village in Phagwara Tehsil in Kapurthala district of Punjab State, India. The village is administrated by a Sarpanch, who is an elected representative.

Demography 
According to the report published by Census India in 2011, Dhak Malikpur has 110 houses with the total population of 531 persons of which 291 are male and 240 females. Literacy rate of Dhak Malikpur is 79.92%, higher than the state average of 75.84%.  The population of children in the age group 0–6 years is 43 which is 8.10% of the total population.  Child sex ratio is approximately 792, lower than the state average of 846.

Population data

References

External links
  Villages in Kapurthala
 Kapurthala Villages List

Villages in Kapurthala district